The North Absaroka Wilderness is located in Shoshone National Forest in the U.S. state of Wyoming. It lies adjacent to the eastern border of Yellowstone National Park.

U.S. Wilderness Areas do not allow motorized or mechanized vehicles, including bicycles. Although camping and fishing are allowed with proper permit, no roads or buildings are constructed and there is also no logging or mining, in compliance with the 1964 Wilderness Act. Wilderness areas within National Forests and Bureau of Land Management areas also allow hunting in season.

See also
 List of U.S. Wilderness Areas

References

External links
 
 
 

Greater Yellowstone Ecosystem
IUCN Category Ib
Protected areas of Park County, Wyoming
Shoshone National Forest
Wilderness areas of Wyoming
1964 establishments in Wyoming
Protected areas established in 1964